Anne of the Indies is a 1951 Technicolor adventure film made by 20th Century Fox. It was directed by Jacques Tourneur and produced by George Jessel.

The film stars Jean Peters and Louis Jourdan, with Debra Paget, Herbert Marshall, Thomas Gomez and James Robertson Justice.

Plot

After seizing a British ship, female pirate captain Anne Providence (Jean Peters) spares LaRochelle  (Louis Jourdan), a Frenchman captured by the British, from walking the plank. He agrees to join Providence's crew and soon she begins to fall for the handsome officer.

They travel to an island where they meet with her pirate mentor Captain Blackbeard (played by Thomas Gomez), who takes an instant dislike to LaRochelle although he at first holds back as he can see Anne is attracted to him. Blackbeard eventually realises he has seen LaRochelle  before in the French navy when a pirate was hanged. When he reveals this, LaRochelle  claims he was dismissed from the French navy. Anne believes him, but when Blackbeard attacks him she defends him and sends Blackbeard and his men away, making an enemy of the notorious pirate.

It eventually transpires that LaRochelle is working for the British as they have captured his ship, and he has a wife. He betrays Anne to the British, who attack her ship. She manages to  escape and takes his wife hostage. The British do not return LaRochelle’s ship to him, having failed to capture Anne as planned, so he acquires a ship of his own to go after Anne. In the confrontation that follows LaRochelle’s ship is destroyed and he is captured.

Taking her revenge Anne maroons him and his wife on a remote island to die. She sails away, but a few days later her conscience compels her to return with provisions and a small boat. As she does so she is attacked by Blackbeard; instead of fleeing she stays and fights to stop Blackbeard from finding LaRochelle, even though her ship is no match. As Anne, the last survivor of her crew, challenges Blackbeard to a final personal duel, she is blown away by a final, deadly salvo from the enemy ship before Blackbeard can stop his cannoneers. Watching the disaster unfold, LaRochelle and his wife pay tribute to Anne's sacrifice.

Cast
 Jean Peters as Anne, also known as Capt. Providence
 Louis Jourdan as Capt. Pierre François LaRochelle
 Debra Paget as Molly LaRochelle
 Herbert Marshall as Dr. Jameson
 Thomas Gomez as Blackbeard
 James Robertson Justice as Red Dougal
 Francis Pierlot as Herkimer
 Sean McClory as Hackett
 Holmes Herbert as British sea captain
 Byron Nelson as Bear handler
 Mario Siletti as Auctioneer
 James Dime as pirate

Production
The film was based on a short story published in the Saturday Evening Post in 1947 by Charleston's historical fiction author, Herbert Sass. Sass was asked by New York publishers and Los Angeles studios to write a movie treatment of the story. In 1948 he offered up a fictionalised version of the true story of Anne Bonny, including a 10-page "factual basis" for the story. Studios seemed responsive, but in the end Sass was left out of the loop until the movie came out in 1951. What ended up on the screen was very different from the original story. Without writer credit to Sass, it would be difficult to convince anyone it was the same story.

In February 1948 Walter Wanger bought the screen rights to the story as a vehicle for Susan Hayward, whom Wanger had under contract. Hayward reportedly was the one who prompted Wanger to make the purchase. The producer hired Jan Fortune to write a script and announced he intended to make the film later that year for Eagle Lion. The film was also known as Queen of the Pirates. It was to be part of a four-picture deal Wanger had with Eagle Lion, the others being Tulsa, The Bastille and The Blank Wall.

In August 1948 Wanger announced he had decided to shelve the film as he believed it would cost too much (the estimated budget was $1.5 million).

In February 1949 it was reported Hayward would make the film at Columbia where Guy Endore was writing a script. Mark Robson was to direct.

By July Hayward was reportedly trying to set the project up at 20th Century Fox  with whom she owned a picture. In May 1950 Fox bought the story, assigned Arthur Caesar to write the script and George Jessel to produce; Hayward was still attached to star.

Susan Hayward Drops Out
Hayward was unable to star in the film. By November 1950 Louis Jourdan was signed to play the male lead and Valentina Cortesa was going to play a female pirate. Jourdan had recently had his contract with David O. Selznick  bought by Fox. He had appeared in Bird of Paradise for Fox with Debra Paget and she was teamed again with him in Anne of the Indies.

Bu January 1951 Cortesa was out as the lead - due to her accent, reportedly - and Constance Smith was being tested. Eventually the title role was given to Jean Peters, her first starring role

"I would have died if I'd lost the part of Anne," said Peters. "The costumes are delirious, any girl would look good in them.; they have tight-fitting trousers and open throat shirt down to here, and free top boots - I'm in rags, really but so picturesque and flattering. And the character is terrific, she's a complete primitive, a girl raised by Blackbeard, the pirate, who knows no other life than the law of might. Just an animal. I can't wait to begin it. Of course, I'm aware it's a dangerous part, too. You could make an awful fool of yourself if you went overboard."

Shooting
Filming started 26 February 1951.

Jacques Tourneur was signed to a long-term contract at Fox after filming completed.

Darryl F. Zanuck later said the studio had developed Peters "for seven years" and she "comes through big" in the film.

References

External links
 
 
 
 

Pirate films
1951 films
1950s historical adventure films
American swashbuckler films
1950s English-language films
Romantic period films
Films scored by Franz Waxman
Films directed by Jacques Tourneur
Films set in the 1710s
Films with screenplays by Philip Dunne
Films set in the Caribbean
Cultural depictions of Anne Bonny
Cultural depictions of Blackbeard
American historical adventure films
1950s American films